Arun was a more or less vassal state of the Sultanate of Aceh, now Indonesia, in the Meureudu area of Sumatra.

History of Aceh